The West Indies women's cricket team toured India and Pakistan between February and April 2004. They played India in five One Day Internationals, which India won 5–0. They played Pakistan in one Test match and seven One Day Internationals, with the Test ending as a draw and the West Indies winning the ODI series 5–2. The Test match was the last Test played by both Pakistan and the West Indies. Pakistan batter Kiran Baluch scored the highest ever score in Women's Test cricket, with 242 in the first innings of the Test match.

Tour of India

Squads

WODI Series

1st ODI

2nd ODI

3rd ODI

4th ODI

5th ODI

Tour of Pakistan

Squads

Only Test

WODI Series

1st ODI

2nd ODI

3rd ODI

4th ODI

5th ODI

6th ODI

7th ODI

References

External links
West Indies Women tour of India 2003/04 from Cricinfo
West Indies Women tour of Pakistan 2003/04 from Cricinfo

Women's international cricket tours of India
International women's cricket competitions in Pakistan
West Indies women's cricket team tours
2004 in women's cricket
Women's international cricket tours of Pakistan
2004 in Pakistani women's sport